Salim Saleh (born Caleb Akandwanaho; 14 January 1960) is a retired Ugandan military officer who served in the Uganda People's Defence Force (UPDF), the armed forces of Uganda. He is a brother to the President of Uganda, Yoweri Museveni, and an adviser to the President on military matters. He served as Minister of State for microfinance from 2006 to 2008. Saleh has featured in controversies regarding corruption, including being implicated by the UN Security Council for plundering natural resources in Democratic Republic of the Congo.

Military career
In 1976, aged 16, he left Kako Secondary School in Masaka to join the Front for National Salvation (FRONASA), a Tanzania-based rebel group formed and led by his brother Yoweri Museveni to fight against the regime of Idi Amin. Together with his friend Fred Rwigyema and his brother Museveni, he trained in Mozambique with Samora Machel's FRELIMO rebels. It was there that he adopted Salim Saleh as his nom de guerre. In 1978, FRONASA merged with other anti-Amin groups in Tanzania and formed the Uganda National Liberation Army (UNLA), who together with Tanzanian armed forces captured Kampala in April 1979 – sending Idi Amin into exile. Saleh was later made a platoon commander of a UNLA unit in Moroto District. Following the bitterly contested December 1980 elections, Museveni declared an armed rebellion against the UNLA and the government of Milton Obote.

Salim Saleh joined his brother's National Resistance Army (NRA) and the guerilla war known as "the bush war", that would last until 1986. In January 1986, Salim Saleh commanded NRA's assault on Kampala, which eventually led to the demise of Tito Okello's regime, with Museveni becoming President. NRA became the national army, with Salim Saleh as a commanding officer, General Elly Tumwine as the Army Commander, and Museveni as the Commander-in-chief.

Saleh proceeded to command an army division against rebel groups that were remnants of the UNLA, including Uganda People's Democratic Army (UPDA), in northern parts of the country. He was instrumental in working out a peace deal with the UPDA.

Saleh succeeded Elly Tumwine as Army Commander in 1987, and held the post until 1989 when, following accusations of corruption, he was sacked from the army by his brother. He later became the senior presidential advisor on defence and security (1996–1998), and the commander of the army's Reserve Force (1990–2001), involved in resettling army veterans of the bush war.

Saleh recalled RPF leaders to Uganda, over the death of the leader of the RPF Fred Rwigyema He arrested Peter Bayingana, who had taken de facto command of the RPF, and Chris Bunyenyezi. Both were executed.

Controversies
While still in the army, Salim Saleh ventured into private business and philanthropy, setting up a string of businesses ranging from real estate to aviation, and becoming one of Uganda's wealthiest businessmen, but also getting involved in several corruption scandals.

Uganda Commercial Bank
In 1998, Salim Saleh resigned from his post as presidential advisor, following allegations that Greenland Investments, a company in which he was a major stakeholder, had used the Malaysian company, Westmont, to illegally purchase shares in Uganda's largest bank, the now defunct Uganda Commercial Bank (UCB). His brother, President Museveni, later said he'd sacked Salim Saleh, not for his involvement in the scandal, but for "indiscipline and drunkenness" in the army.

Junk helicopters
In 1998, Salim Saleh's company purchased helicopters for the army, for which he received a commission of $800,000. The helicopters turned out to be junk.

Involvement in Congo (DRC)
Salim Saleh was specifically implicated in a UN Security Council report for being involved in the illegal exploitation of natural resources from Congo (DRC) during the Second Congo War
. The government of Uganda dismissed the report, and no punitive actions were taken against those involved.

Latest developments
In 2005, Salim Saleh, then a Lieutenant General, was one of the pioneer class to graduate from the Uganda Senior Command and Staff College at Kimaka in Jinja. Following that course, he was promoted to the rank of General in the UPDF. Prior to the 2006 General Elections, Salim Saleh went back to school and obtained an A-level certificate, the minimum requirement to become a member of Parliament of Uganda. Following the elections, he was appointed Minister of State for Microfinance.

See also
 Elly Tumwine
 Mugisha Muntu
 Jeje Odongo
 James Kazini
 Aronda Nyakairima

References

External links
 A look back at Salim Saleh’s 40-year liberation journey
 Profile of General Salim Saleh In September 2012
  Partial List of Senior UPDF Commanders

1960 births
Living people
Ugandan military personnel
Ugandan rebels
Ugandan generals
Government ministers of Uganda
Uganda Senior Command and Staff College alumni